Artwashing describes the use of art and artists in a positive way to distract from or legitimize negative actions by an individual, organization, country, or government—especially in reference to gentrification.

Etymology 
With a structure similar to terms such as pinkwashing and purplewashing, it is a portmanteau of the words "art" and "whitewashing." The term was coined in the 2017 protests against gentrification in the Boyle Heights neighborhood of Los Angeles.

Examples 

 The gentrification of the Boyle Heights neighborhood of Los Angeles, CA.
 Donations from the Sackler family, owners of the pharmaceutical company at the center of the US opioid crisis, to museums such as the Guggenheim Museum, the Metropolitan Museum of Art, and the Tate Gallery.

References 

Corruption
Gentrification
Cover-ups
Art
2017 neologisms